The lighthouses system of Puerto Rico consists of lighthouses that were built mostly during the last twenty years of the nineteenth century. These served as guides to important marine routes.

In 1869 the Spanish government approved the first plan for Puerto Rico in order to serve the ships that sail through its waters. The lighthouses are located in prominent and isolated areas with good visibility towards the sea. The classification system of the lighthouses of Puerto Rico was based on the characteristics of the lens, and the structure. The lights of the first and second order have a wider light to warn ships of the proximity to land, followed by the minor lights, whose scope was limited to smaller harbors and bays and to connect the primary lights in the system.

In 1898, the United States acquired the lighthouses of Puerto Rico as a result of the Spanish–American War. In 1900, the United States Lighthouse Board acquired responsibility for the aids to navigation. The lights are maintained by the Coast Guard since 1939.

In 1981, the lighthouses of Puerto Rico were listed in the National Register of Historic Places.  In 2000, they were included by the Puerto Rican government in the National Register of Historic Properties of Puerto Rico.

The Coast Guard has been transferring responsibility of the lighthouses to local government and conservation organizations. Some of the lighthouses have been fully restored and are open to the public. In 2001, under the National Historic Lighthouse Preservation Act, Cape San Juan Light became the first lighthouse to be transferred to a non-governmental organization in Puerto Rico.

List of lighthouses in Puerto Rico

The following is a list of  lighthouses in Puerto Rico:

See also
 Lighthouses in the United States
 Lists of lighthouses and lightvessels

References

External links

 Inventory of Historic Light Stations: Puerto Rico Lighthouses, United States National Park Service Maritime Heritage Program
 Presidential Proclamation annexing lighthouses, 30 June 1903.
 

Puerto Rico
Lighthouses
Lighthouses